The SBC Senior Open was a golf tournament on the Senior PGA Tour from 1989 to 2002. It was played in several different cities, mostly in the Chicago area.

The purse for the 2002 tournament was US$1,450,000, with $217,500 going to the winner. The tournament was founded in 1989 as the Ameritech Senior Open.

Winners
2002 Bob Gilder
2001 Dana Quigley
2000 Tom Kite

Ameritech Senior Open
1999 Hale Irwin
1998 Hale Irwin
1997 Gil Morgan
1996 Walter Morgan
1995 Hale Irwin
1994 John Paul Cain
1993 George Archer
1992 Dale Douglass
1991 Mike Hill
1990 Chi-Chi Rodríguez
1989 Bruce Crampton

Source:

References

External links
Brief history of the SBC Senior Open

Former PGA Tour Champions events
Golf in Chicago
Golf in Michigan
Golf in Ohio
Recurring sporting events established in 1989
Recurring sporting events disestablished in 2002
1989 establishments in Ohio
2002 disestablishments in Illinois